The 2018 Intrust Super Premiership NSW season was the tenth season of the New South Wales Cup, the top rugby league competition administered by the New South Wales Rugby League. The competition acts as a second-tier league to the ten New South Wales-based National Rugby League clubs, as well the Canberra Raiders and New Zealand Warriors. The winner of the Premiership, the Canterbury-Bankstown Bulldogs, competed against the winner of the 2018 Queensland Cup, the Redcliffe Dolphins in the 2018 NRL State Championship, which they won 42-18. The Penrith Panthers were the defending champions, following their 20-12 victory against the Wyong Roos in the 2017 Grand Final.

Teams 
In 2018, 12 clubs fielded teams in the Intrust Super Premiership. Illawarra RLFC were renamed to the St George Illawarra Dragons to bring the club in line with the NRL’s ‘whole of game’ strategy, that will also see top-grade squads increased from 25 players to 30.

An under-20s competition will be run in parallel to the New South Wales Cup.

Ladder 

 Teams highlighted in green have qualified for the finals
 The team highlighted in blue has clinched the minor premiership
 The team highlighted in red has clinched the wooden spoon

Finals 

Source:

Television Broadcast 
Fox League will continue to broadcast a game per round, however Channel 9 will also be broadcasting a game per round starting with the 2018 for the first time.

References

New South Wales Cup
2018 in Australian rugby league
2018 in New Zealand rugby league